The 1988 Tournament of the Americas, later known as the FIBA Americas Championship and the FIBA AmeriCup, was a basketball championship hosted by Uruguay from 22 to 31 May 1988.  The games were played in Montevideo.  This FIBA AmeriCup was to earn the three berths allocated to the Americas for the 1988 Summer Olympics in Seoul.  The United States did not participate in the tournament, as the team had already been awarded a berth in the Olympics. Brazil defeated Puerto Rico in the final to win the tournament. Canada beat Uruguay in the third place game to claim the final Olympic berth.

Qualification
Eight teams qualified during the qualification tournaments held in their respective zones in 1987; Canada qualified automatically since they are one of only two members of the North America zone. Panama and the Dominican Republic withdrew from the tournament. The teams formed a single group of seven teams.

North America: 
Caribbean and Central America:, 

Format
The top four teams from the main group advance to the semifinals.
The winners in the knockout semifinals advanced to the Final and were granted berths in the 1988 Summer Olympics tournament in Seoul. The losers figure in a third-place playoff where the winner was given the third and final place in the Olympics.

Squads

Preliminary round

|}

Knockout stage

Awards

Final standings

References

1988 Olympic Qualifying Tournament for Men, FIBA.com.

FIBA AmeriCup
1988 in Uruguayan sport
International basketball competitions hosted by Uruguay
1987–88 in North American basketball
1987–88 in South American basketball